Midlands 2 West (North) is a level 7 English Rugby Union league and level 2 of the Midlands League, made up of clubs from the northern part of the West Midlands region including Shropshire, Staffordshire, parts of Birmingham and the West Midlands and occasionally Cheshire, with home and away matches played throughout the season.  When this division began in 1992 it was known as Midlands West 1, until it was split into two regional divisions called Midlands 3 West (North) and Midlands 3 West (South) ahead of the 2000–01 season.  Further restructuring of the Midlands leagues ahead of the 2009–10 season, lead to the current name of Midlands 2 West (North).

Promoted teams tend to move up to Midlands 1 West with the league champions going up automatically and the runners up having to play a playoff against the runners up from Midlands 2 West (South) for their place. Demoted teams typically drop to Midlands 3 West (North).  Each year all clubs in the division also take part in the RFU Intermediate Cup - a level 7 national competition.

2021-22

2020–21
Due to the COVID-19 pandemic, the 2020–21 season was cancelled.

2019–20

2018–19

2017–18

Teams 2016-17
Camp Hill
Kidderminster Carolians
Leek (relegated from Midlands 1 West)
Newcastle (Staffs)  (promoted from Midlands 3 West (North))
Old Saltleians
Old Yardleians
Shrewsbury 
Stafford
Stourbridge Lions
Tamworth  (promoted from Midlands 3 West (North))
Veseyans

Teams 2015-16
Camp Hill
Handsworth  (promoted from Midlands 3 West (North))
Harborne  (promoted from Midlands 3 West (North))
Kidderminster Carolians
Moseley Oak
Old Saltleians
Old Yardleians (transferred from Midlands 2 West (South))
Shrewsbury 
Stafford
Stourbridge Lions  
Veseyans
Wolverhampton

Teams 2014-15
Bridgnorth 
Camp Hill
Kidderminster Carolians (transferred from Midlands 2 West (South))
Ludlow	
Moseley Oak
Old Saltleians	
Shrewsbury (promoted from Midlands 3 West (North))
Stafford
Stourbridge Lions  
Tamworth RFC
Veseyans (promoted from Midlands 3 West (North))
Wolverhampton

Teams 2013-14
Aston Old Edwardians
Bridgnorth
Camp Hill (relegated from Midlands 1 West)
Crewe & Nantwich
Leek
Ludlow
Moseley Oak
Old Saltleians
Stafford
Tamworth RFC
Willenhall (promoted from Midlands 3 West (North))
Wolverhampton

Teams 2012–13
Aston Old Edwardians
Bridgnorth
Leek
Lordswood Dixonians
Moseley Oak	
Old Saltleians
Silhillians RFC (transferred from Midlands 2 West (South))	
Spartans (Midlands)
Stafford
Tamworth RFC
Veseyans
Wolverhampton

Teams 2011–12
Aston Old Edwardians
Bridgnorth
Burntwood (promoted from Midlands 3 West (North))
Edgbaston Dixonians
Leek
Moseley Oak (promoted from Midlands 3 West (North))
Old Saletians
Shrewsbury
Spartans
Stafford
Stoke-on-Trent (relegated from Midlands 1 West)
Stourbridge Lions 
Tamworth

Teams 2010-11
Aston Old Edwardians
Bridgnorth  
Leek  
Lordswood Dixonians
Ludlow  
Old Saltleians
Shrewsbury
Stafford
Stoke-on-Trent
Stourbridge Lions 
Tamworth
Willenhall

Original teams

Teams in Midlands 2 West (North) and Midlands 2 West (South) were originally part of a single division called Midlands 1 West, which contained the following sides when in was introduced in 1992:

Bromsgrove - relegated from Midlands 2 West (11th)
Dudley Kingswinford - promoted from North Midlands 1 (runners up)
Kings Norton - promoted from North Midlands 1 (4th)
Leek - promoted from Staffordshire/Warwickshire 1 (4th)
Ludlow - promoted from North Midlands 1 (5th)
Newbold-on-Avon - relegated from Midlands 2 West (9th)
Newcastle (Staffs) - promoted from Staffordshire/Warwickshire 1 (runners up)
Old Halesonians - promoted from North Midlands 1 (3rd)
Old Leamingtonians - promoted from Staffordshire/Warwickshire 1 (5th)
Old Longtonians - promoted from Staffordshire/Warwickshire 1 (champions)
Old Yardleians - promoted from North Midlands 1 (champions)
Sutton Coldfield - relegated from Midlands 2 West (10th)
Willenhall - promoted from Staffordshire/Warwickshire 1 (3rd)

Midlands 2 West (North) honours

Midlands West 1 (1992–1993)

Midlands 2 West (North) and Midlands 2 West (South) were originally part of a single tier 7 division called Midlands West 1.  Promotion was to Midlands 2 and relegation to Midlands West 2.

Midlands West 1 (1993–1996)

The top six teams from Midlands 1 and the top six from North 1 were combined to create National 5 North, meaning that Midlands 1 West dropped to become a tier 8 league.  Promotion and relegation continued to Midlands 2 and  Midlands West 2.

Midlands West 1 (1996–2000)

At the end of the 1995–96 season National 5 North was discontinued and Midlands West 1 returned to being a tier 7 league.  Promotion and relegation continued to Midlands 2 and  Midlands West 2.

Midlands 3 West (North) (2000–2009)

Restructuring ahead of the 2000–01 season saw Midlands West 1 split  into two tier 7 regional leagues - Midlands 3 West (North) and Midlands 3 West (South).  Promotion was now to Midlands 2 West (formerly Midlands 2) and relegation to Midlands 4 West (North) (formerly Midlands West 2).

Midlands 2 West (North) (2009–present)

League restructuring by the RFU meant that Midlands 3 West (North) and Midlands 3 West (South) were renamed as Midlands 2 West (North) and Midlands 2 West (South), with both leagues remaining at tier 7.  Promotion was now to Midlands 1 West (formerly Midlands 2 West) and relegation to Midlands 3 West (North) (formerly Midlands 4 West (North)).

Promotion play-offs
Since the 2000–01 season there has been a play-off between the runners-up of Midlands 2 West (North) and Midlands 2 West (South) for the third and final promotion place to Midlands 1 West (asides from 2008-09 which was played between the runners up of Midlands 2 West (South) and Midlands 2 East (North) due to RFU restructuring). The team with the superior league record has home advantage in the tie.  At the end of the 2019–20 season the Midlands 2 West (South) teams had ten wins to Midlands 2 West (North) teams eight; and the home team has won promotion on eleven occasions compared to the away teams seven.

Number of league titles

Camp Hill (2)
Lichfield (2)
Ludlow (2)
Moseley Oak (2)
Aston Old Edwardians (1)
Bridgnorth (1)
Burton (1)
Leek (1)
Longton (1)
Lordswood Dixonians (1)
Luctonians (1)
Malvern (1)
Newbold-on-Avon (1)
Newport (Salop) (1)
Old Halesonians (1)
Sandbach (1)
Shrewsbury (1)
Silhillians (1)
Stoke-on-Trent (1)
Stourbridge Lions (1)
Sutton Coldfield (1)
Whitchurch (1)
Willenhall (1)
Wolverhampton (1)

Notes

See also
 Midlands RFU
North Midlands RFU
Staffordshire RU
English rugby union system
Rugby union in England

References

External links
Current League Table

7
3